Nopaltzin was a 13th-century Chichimec leader, a tlatoani. His name means "Cactus King" in the Nahuatl language.

A Chichimec ruler, the son of the celebrated King Xolotl and his wife, Nopaltzin assisted his father in founding the Chichimec capital, Tenayuca. He inherited the throne at the age of 60 in 1304 AD, and introduced Toltec culture to his people. Nopaltzin's son Tlotzin Pochotl, the "Hawk", continued his father's civilizing efforts.

Following the death of Xolotl, the kingdom was left to Nopaltzin, who took formal possession, by shooting four arrows, to the four winds, resolved to fix his residence in Tenayuca, within six miles of the Mexican lake, and to distribute his people upon the neighbouring lands.

The accession of Nopaltzin to the throne was celebrated with acclamations and rejoicings, for forty days. When the nobles took their leave to return to their respective states, one of them thus addressed the king: 
 
Nopaltzin was sixty years old when he ascended the throne, and was surrounded by his children and grandchildren. He conferred upon Tlotzin (Pochotl), the first born son of his Toltecan queen, the government of Tezcuco; and upon his two younger brothers, the states of Zacatlan, and Tenamitic, respectively, in order that they might betimes acquire the difficult art of ruling over men.

References 

Tlatoque
13th-century monarchs